Duje Javorčić (born 25 November 1999) is a Croatian footballer who most recently played as a midfielder.

Club career

FC Nitra
Javorčić made his Slovak Fortuna Liga debut for Nitra against Pohronie on 15 February 2020. He started the match in the starting-XI of Anatoliy Demyanenko, but was replaced by Ugandan international Isaac Muleme after over 80 minutes due to an injury. In the match, Javorčić was booked with a yellow card. The fixture concluded in a goal-less tie.

References

External links
 Futbalnet profile
 
 Fortuna Liga profile

1999 births
Living people
Footballers from Split, Croatia
Association football midfielders
Croatian footballers
Croatia youth international footballers
S.S. Lazio players
Amiens SC players
FC Nitra players
NK Dugopolje players
Championnat National 3 players
Slovak Super Liga players
First Football League (Croatia) players
Croatian expatriate footballers
Expatriate footballers in Italy
Croatian expatriate sportspeople in Italy
Expatriate footballers in France
Croatian expatriate sportspeople in France
Expatriate footballers in Slovakia
Croatian expatriate sportspeople in Slovakia